Johann Christian Köpping (1704 – 1772) was a German curator, best known as an assistant of .

Born in Großbothen, Köpping started his education at the Thomasschule, Leipzig, before Bach's arrival in the city.  He was a "Thomaner" from 1718 to 1726, studying under Bach between 1723 and 1726. He later became the curator of the Thomasschule. In the 1720s he assisted Bach as a copyist, and produced the only known copy of a score of O heilges Geist- und Wasserbad, BWV 165 in 1724.

References

External links 
 Köpping, Johann Christian: Schriftprobe Johann Christian Köpping sample of Köpping's writing, Staatsbibliothek Berlin

1704 births
1772 deaths
German music educators
Music copyists
People educated at the St. Thomas School, Leipzig
Pupils of Johann Sebastian Bach
18th-century composers
18th-century German male musicians
18th-century German educators